In algebra, the Jacobson–Bourbaki theorem is a theorem used to  extend Galois theory to field extensions that need not be separable. The extension of Galois theory to normal extensions is called the Jacobson–Bourbaki correspondence, which replaces the correspondence between some subfields of a field and some subgroups of a Galois group by a correspondence between some sub division rings of a division ring and some subalgebras of an associative algebra.

The Jacobson–Bourbaki theorem implies both the usual Galois correspondence for subfields of a Galois extension, and Jacobson's Galois correspondence for subfields of a purely inseparable extension of exponent at most 1.

Statement
Suppose that L is a division ring.
The Jacobson–Bourbaki theorem states that there is a natural 1:1 correspondence between:
Division rings K in L of finite index n (in other words L is a finite-dimensional left vector space over K).
Unital K-algebras of finite dimension n (as K-vector spaces) contained in the ring of endomorphisms of the additive group of K.

The sub division ring and the corresponding subalgebra are each other's commutants.

 gave an extension to sub division rings that might have infinite index, which correspond to closed subalgebras in the finite topology.

References

Field (mathematics)
Theorems in algebra